Farina Mir is a historian and a professor at the University of Michigan. She has a keen interest in the history of colonial and postcolonial South Asia, with a particular interest in the social, cultural, and religious history of late-colonial north India.

Education
In 1993, Mir received her B.A. in English literature and Asian & Middle Eastern Cultures from Barnard College and in 2002, she received her Ph.D. in History with distinction from Columbia University.

Notable Works
   
 Punjab Reconsidered: History, Culture, and Practice, ed. Anshu Malhotra and Farina Mir. (New Delhi: Oxford University Press, 2012).
 Genre and Devotion in Punjab's Popular Narratives: Rethinking Cultural and Religious Syncretism," Comparative Studies in Society and History 48.3, July, 2006: 727-758.

Awards
 John F. Richard Prize in South Asian History from the American Historical Association (2011)
 Bernard Cohn Prize from the Association of Asian Studies (2012)

References

Living people
21st-century American historians
University of Michigan faculty
Year of birth missing (living people)